We Are Twisted Fucking Sister! is a 2014 German-US documentary about the early years of heavy metal band Twisted Sister directed by Andrew Horn.

Synopsis 
Through interviews, filmmaker Andrew Horn traces the history of Twisted Sister from their origins in the bar scene of early 1970s Long Island to their pre-MTV rise as a popular regional, New York-based band in the mid 1970s and early 1980s.

Production 
Horn became acquainted with the band when he made his previous documentary, The Nomi Song.  Though he was not a fan, he found the band to be interesting and entertaining.

Release 
In 2014, Dee Snider endorsed the documentary and its  Indiegogo crowdfunding campaign for distribution.  We Are Twisted Fucking Sister! premiered at the International Documentary Film Festival Amsterdam on November 30, 2014.  Band member Jay Jay French attended the premiere.  A preview fundraiser was held at a club in Ferndale, Michigan, on January 9, 2015.

Reception 
Neil Young of The Hollywood Reporter called it "a raucously riotous rags-to-riches record of rip-roaring rock renegades".  Geoffrey Macnab of The Independent wrote that it is "uproarious and poignant by turns".

References

External links 
 

2014 films
2014 documentary films
American documentary films
German documentary films
Documentary films about heavy metal music and musicians
Documentary films about musical groups
2010s English-language films
2010s American films
2010s German films